Eduardo Barragán (born July 1, 1951 in Cartagena de Chairá, Caquetá) is a retired Colombian boxer, who competed for his South American nation at the 1972 Summer Olympics in Munich, West Germany.

There he was defeated in the first round of the Men's Bantamweight (– 54 kg) division by Kenya's John Nderu. Barragan won the gold medal in the Flyweight (– 51 kg) division at the 1970 Central American and Caribbean Games in Panama City, Panama.

References

External links
Eduardo Barragan at sports-reference.com

1951 births
Living people
Flyweight boxers
Bantamweight boxers
Boxers at the 1972 Summer Olympics
Olympic boxers of Colombia
People from Bolívar Department
Colombian male boxers
Central American and Caribbean Games gold medalists for Colombia
Competitors at the 1970 Central American and Caribbean Games
Central American and Caribbean Games medalists in boxing
20th-century Colombian people